An elementary stream (ES) as defined by the MPEG communication protocol is usually the output of an audio encoder or video encoder. An ES contains only one kind of data (e.g. audio, video, or closed caption). An elementary stream is often referred to as "elementary", "data", "audio", or "video" bitstreams or streams. The format of the elementary stream depends upon the codec or data carried in the stream, but will often carry a common header when packetized into a packetized elementary stream.

Header for MPEG-2 video elementary stream

General layout of MPEG-1 audio elementary stream 

The digitized sound signal is divided up into blocks of 384 samples in Layer I and 1152 samples in Layers II and III. The sound sample block is encoded within an audio frame:
 header
 error check
 audio data
 ancillary data
The header of a frame contains general information such as the MPEG Layer, the sampling frequency, the number of channels, whether the frame is CRC protected, whether the sound is the original:

Although most of this information may be the same for all frames, MPEG decided to give each audio frame such a header in order to simplify synchronization and bitstream editing.

See also
 MP3
 Packetized elementary stream
 MPEG program stream
 MPEG transport stream

External links
 ISO/IEC 11172-3:1993: Information technology -- Coding of moving pictures and associated audio for digital storage media at up to about 1,5 Mbit/s -- Part 3: Audio

MPEG